Palm Desert High School is a secondary school located in Palm Desert, California.  The school is a part of the Desert Sands Unified School District.

Academics 
Palm Desert offers numerous Advanced Placement and Honors courses, amongst CP classes.

Clubs

 21st Century Bike Club
 Academic Decathlon
 Activism Now
 ASB
 Aztec Couture Fashion Club
 Aztec Film Club
 Aztec Impact
 Best Buddies
 BSU (Bold, Strong and United)
 Chamber Singers
 Cheer
 Chess Club
 Choreography Club
 Christian Club
 Class of 2018
 Class of 2019
 Class of 2020
 Class of 2021
 Club Mud
 Color Guard
 Comic Book Club
 Concert Band
 CSF
 Dance Club
 Dance Team
 Debate Club
 Drama Club
 ENLACE
 Ensemble
 Environmental Science
 Equestrian Club
Ethnic Studies
 FCA (Fellowship of Christian Athletes)
 Fight Club
 French Club
 Friday Night Live
 GSA 
 Hip Hop Club
 Interact
 Iron Chefs
 Jazz Ensemble
 Jewish Club
 JSA
 Link Crew
 Marching Aztecs
 Martha's Kitchen Club
 Mock Trial
 Model United Nations
 Mythology
 Multicultural Club
 NHS
 National Watching JSA Club Club (NWJCC)
 Percussion Ensemble
 Print Media Club
 PTO
 Readers to Leaders
 Robotics Club
 Roller Blading Club
 SAAC (Students Against Animal Cruelty)
 Scribble-Lit Arts Mag
 Slam Club
 Spear
 Spear It Tribe
 Swole Club
 Taco Dogshow
 Taft Club 
 Ultimate Frisbee
 Vegetarian Club
 Volleyball Club
 Wind Ensemble
 Yearbook
 Younglife
 Youth & Government

Sports
Palm Desert's mascot is the Aztec. The school has tennis, cross country, soccer, track, golf, swimming, baseball, softball, volleyball, basketball, football, wrestling, water polo and equestrian teams. Their main rival in the Desert Empire League is the La Quinta High School Blackhawks.

Reconstruction
Palm Desert High School was reconstructed as part of the District's $100 million bond used for PDHS, Lincoln, Kennedy, and Eisenhower schools. The new campus has been built to the north of the old campus using the former sports fields for land. The project was completely finished by the beginning of the 2011–12 school year. The new fields opened by the following year. A new gymnasium has been built to seat approximately 2000 students.

Notable alumni

 D. J. Alexander - class of 2010, NFL linebacker with the Philadelphia Eagles
Scott Burcham - American-Israeli baseball shortstop in the Colorado Rockies organization, and for Team Israel
 Nicole Castrale – class of 1997, professional golfer on LPGA Tour
 Chris Clapinski - class of 1989, former Major League Baseball player
 James Dockery – class of 2006, NFL cornerback with the Carolina Panthers
 Thomas DeMarco - class of 2007, CFL quarterback with the Ottawa Redblacks
 Josh Homme – class of 1991, Queens of the Stone Age, Eagles of Death Metal, Kyuss, and Them Crooked Vultures
 Jesse Hughes – class of 1990, singer and guitarist of rock band Eagles of Death Metal
 Brooks Kriske - class of 2012, Major League Baseball pitcher for the New York Yankees and Baltimore Orioles
 Desirae Krawczyk - class of 2012, professional tennis player, mixed doubles winner of the French Open, US Open, and Wimbledon
 Alison Lohman – class of 1997, actress
 Brian Serven - class of 2013, Major League Baseball catcher for the Colorado Rockies

References

External links
 PDHS Home Page
 
 Palm Desert High School Foundation - Supporting Excellence in Academics at PDHS

Educational institutions established in 1986
High schools in Riverside County, California
Public high schools in California
1986 establishments in California